John Sunderland may refer to:

 John William Sunderland (c. 1896–1945), English Labour Party politician, Member of Parliament for Preston July–November 1945
 Sir John Sunderland (businessman) (fl. 2000s), President of the Confederation of British Industry (CBI)

See also
Jon Sunderland, English footballer